This is a list of railroad executives, defined as those who are presidents and chief executive officers of railroad and railway systems worldwide.

A 
 Abbot, Edwin H. (1834–1927), WC −1890
 Adams, Charles Francis, Jr. (1835–1915), UP 1884–1890
 Adams, Melvin O. (1847–1920), BRB&L
 Aikman, Frank, Jr., LIRR 1967–1969
 Allen, Horatio (1802–1889), Erie 1843–1844
  Allen, John W. (1802–1887), CNR 1834, C&C 1845
 Allyn, Henry G., Jr., P&LE 1969–1993
 Alpert, George, NH
 Altschul, Selig, D&H 1977
 Ames, Oliver, Jr. (1807–1877), UP 1866–1871
 Anderson, Richard H. (born 1955), Amtrak 2017–2020 
 Anderson, Samuel J., P&O
 Anschutz, Philip (born 1939), RG 1984–1988, SP 1988–1996
Archbald, James (1793–1870), LSMS 1854–1856
 Arndt, Otto, DR 1970–1989
 Ashby, G. F., UP 1946–1949
 Ashley, James Mitchell (1824–1896), AA
 Atkinson, Arthur K. (1892–1964), WAB 1947–1960
 Atterbury, William W. (1866–1935), PRR 1925–1935
 Augustowski, Tadeusz, PKP −2005

B 
 Baer, George Frederick (1842–1914), RDG 1901–1914
 Bailey, E. H., UP 1965–1971
 Baldwin, William H., Jr. (1863–1905), LIRR 1896–1905
 Bancroft, William Amos (1855–1922), BER 1899–
 Bandeen, Robert (1930–2010), CN 1974–1982
 Banfield, Edward (1837–1872), GFS (1865–1872).
 Barriger, John W., III (1899–1976), Monon 1946–1953, P&LE 1956–1964, MKT 1965–1970, B&M 1973–1974
 Bauer, Kenneth J., LIRR 2000–2003
 Beatty, Edward Wentworth (1877–1943), CPR 1918–1943
 Beckley, Thomas M., SOO 1978–1983
 Beeching, Richard (1913–1985), BR 1961–1965

 Belozyorov, Oleg (b. 1969), Russian Railways 2015-present
 Bennett, James I., P&LE 1877–1881
 Berdell, Robert H., Erie 1864–1867
 Bernet, John J. (1868–1935), NKP 1916–1926, Erie 1927–1929, C&O 1929–1932, NKP 1933–1935
 Bertrand, Charles E., D&H 1977–1978
 Besener, Willi, DR 1946–1949
 Beven, John L., IC 1938–1945
 Biaggini, Benjamin (1916–2005), SP 1964–1983
 Billings, Frederick H. (1823–1890), NP 1879–1881
 Blackstone, Timothy B. (1829–1900), CA 1864–1899
 Blake, Ronald James (b. 1934), KCRC 2006–present
 Bledsoe, Samuel T. (1868–1939), ATSF 1933–1939
 Boardman, Joseph H. (1948–2019), Amtrak 2008–2016
 Boatner, Victor V. (1881–1950), CGW 1929–1931
 Bolton, John, D&H 1826–1831
 Bond, Frank S., RDG 1883–
 Bond, Hiram (1838–1906), TCI 1889–1891
 Borne, Élisabeth (b. 1961), RATP 2015-2017
 Bowen, James (1808–1886), Erie 1841–1842
 Bowman, Hollis, MEC 1863–1864
 Boyd, Alan Stephenson (1922–2020), IC 1969–1972, Amtrak 1978–1982
 Brooke, George D., C&O 1933–, PM 1933–, NKP 1935–, VGN
 Brosnan, D. William (1903–1985), SOU 1962–1967
 Brown, Revelle W., RDG
 Bruce, Harry J., IC 1983–1990
 Bryant, Gridley (1789–1867), Granite Railway

 Bryant, Robert E., BBRR -present
 Budd, John M. (1907–1979), CEI 1947–1949, GN 1951–1970, BN 1970–1972
 Budd, Ralph (1879–1962), GN 1919–1932, CB&Q 1932–1949
 Buenrostro, Hugo Jiménez, KCSM 2006–present
 Buford, Algernon S. (1826–1911), R&D 1865–1892
 Buford, Curtis D., P&LE 1965–1969
 Burbidge, Fred, CPR 1972–1981
 Burdakin, John H., GTW
 Burkhardt, Ed, WC 1987–1999, Railworld 2000–present
 Burns, John J., Alleghany Corporation
 Burns, Ron (b. 1953), UP 1996
 Burt, Horace G. (1849–1913), UP 1898–1904
 Burtness, Harold W. (1897–1978), CGW 1946–1948
 Bury, Oliver Robert Hawke (1861–1946), GWR Brazil 1892–1894, GNR 1902–1912, LNER 1912–1945
 Bush, Benjamin Franklin (1860–1927), WM 1907–1911, MP 1911–1923, D&RG 1912–1915, WP 1913–1915 
 Busiel, Charles Albert (1842–1901), LSR, C&M
 Butzelaar, Frank, SRY 2008–present

C 
 Cable, Ransom Reed, RI 1883–1898
 

 Cahill, Michael Harrison, MKT 1930–1933
 Calhoun, Patrick (1856–1943), URRSF
 Calvin, E. E., UP 1916–1918
 Carpenter, Alvin "Pete" (1942-2019), CSX 1992-1999 
 Carter, George L. (1857–1936),CRR
 Carter, Thomas S. (1921–2019), KCS 1973–1986
 Cass, George Washington (1810–1888), O&P 1856, PFW&C 1857–83, NP 1872–75
 Cassatt, Alexander (1839–1906), PRR 1899–1906
 Cavanaugh, Dennis Miles, SOO 1983–1986, 1987–1989
 Celinski, Krzysztof, PKP 2005–present
 Chapin, Chester W. (1798–1883), B&A 1868–1878
 Charlick, Oliver, LIRR 1863–1875
 Chipley, William Dudley (1840–1897), C&R, P&A
 Christy, Doug, IAIS
 Clark, Horace F. (1815–1873), UP 1872–1873
 Clark, John P., NYSW
 Clark, S.H.H. (1837–1900), UP 1892–1898
 Clarke, F. B., SP&S 1907–
 Claytor, Robert B. (1922–1993), N&W 1981–1982, NS 1982–1993
 Claytor, W. Graham, Jr. (1912–1994), SOU 1967–1977, Amtrak 1982–1993
 Clement, Martin W. (1881–1966), PRR 1935–1948
 Coe, William R. (1869–1955), VGN
 Coleman, D'Alton Corry (1879–1956), CPR 1942–1947
 Coleman, William C. (1901–1976), Monon 1962–1967
 Coliton, William P., CSS&SB 1961–
 Colket, Coffin, LIRR 1862–1863
 Collins, David J., BPRR -present
 Colnon, Aaron, RI 1942–1947
 Conti, P. Scott, PW 2005–present
 Cooke, Jay (1821–1905), NP
 Coolidge, T. Jefferson (1831–1920), ATSF 1880–1881
 Corbin, Austin (1827–1896), LIRR 1881–1896
 Corning, Erastus (1794–1872), U&S 1830s–1853, NYC 1853–1865
 Côté, Paul (b. 1951), Via 2005–2010
 Couch, C. P. "Pete" (1890–1955), KCS 1939–1941
 Couch, Harvey C. (1877–1941), KCS 1939
 Cowen, John K. (1844–1904), B&O 1896–1901
 Crane, L. Stanley, SOU 1977–1980
 Crocker, Charles (1822–1888), CP
 Crosbie, William, Amtrak (acting) 2008
 Crump, Norris Ray "Buck" (1904–1989), CPR 1955–1964 and 1966
 Crush, William, MKT
 Culver, Andrew, Prospect Park and Coney Island Railroad

D 
 Davidson, Richard K. (b. 1942), UP (president) 1991–1996 (CEO) 1997–2006
 Davis, Champion McDonald, ACL
 Davis, James, UTAH 2002–2008
 Davis, Jerry, CSX 1989–1995, SP 1995–1996, UP 1996–1998
 deButts, Harry A., SOU 1951–1962
 deForest, Henry, SP 1925–1932
 Delatour, H.L., LIRR 1949–1950
 Denney, Charles E. (1879–1965), Erie 1929–1939, NP 1939–1950
 
 Depew, Chauncey M. (1834–1928), NYC 1885–1898
 Deramus, William N., Jr. (1888–1965), KCS 1941–1961
 Deramus, William N., III (1915–1989), CGW 1949–1957, MKT 1957–1961, KCS 1961–1973
 Deramus, William N., IV (b. 1944), KCS 1986–1990
 Dermody, James J., LIRR 2003–2006
 Dickinson, Jacob M. (1851–1928), RI 1915–1917
 Dickson, Thomas, D&H 1869–1884
 Dillon, Sidney (1812–1892), UP 1874–1884 and 1890–1892
 Dix, John Adams (1798–1879), C&RI, M&M, UP 1863–1868, Erie 1872
 Dixon, William J., RI 1970–1974
 Dodge, Edwin V., SOO 1989–
 Donnelly, Charles (1869–1939), NP 1920–1939
 Dougherty, A. A., SMV 1911–
 Downs, Lawrence A., IC 1926–1938
 Downs, Thomas, Amtrak 1993–1998
 Draney, Herbert J., NYSW −1968
 Draper, William Henry, Jr. (1894–1974), LIRR 1950–1951
 Drew, Daniel (1797–1879), Erie 1857–1870
 Drusch, William F., TCW 2001–2007
 Ducharme, Rick (b. 1948), GO 1993–1999, TTC 1999–2006
 Duff, John, UP 1873–1874
 Dumaine, Frederick C., Jr., NH 1951–1954, D&H 1967–1968
 Durant, Charles W., RI 1863–1866
 Dürr, Heinz (b. 1933), DB 1991–1993, DB AG 1993–1997

E 
 Eaton, Cyrus S. (1883–1979), C&O 1950s
 Edson, Job A. (1854–1928), KCS 1905–1918 and 1920–1927
 Edwards, George W. (b. 1939), KCS 1991–1995
 Eldridge, John S., Erie 1867–1868
 Elliott, Howard (1860–1928), NP 1903–1913, NH 1913–
 Emerson, Robert A. "Bob", CPR 1964–1966
 Engel, Edward J., ATSF 1939–1944
 Erickson, E.O. "Jim", AA -present
 Eriksen, Søren, DSB 2006–2011
 Evans, Ike, UP 1998–2004

F 

 Fadeev, Gennady, Russian Railways
 Farnam, Henry (1803–1883), RI 1854–1863
 Farrington, John Dow, RI 1948–1955
 Felton, Samuel Morse, Jr. (1853–1930), CA 1899–1908, CGW 1909–1929
 Fernandez, Vicente Corta, TFM April 2005 – July 2005
 Finley, William, SOU 1906–1913
 Finney, F. N., SOO 1890–1892
 Fish, Stuyvesant (1851–1923), IC 1887–1906
 Fishwick, John "Jack" P., EL, D&H 1968–1970, N&W 1970–1981
 Fisk, George B., LIRR 1839–1847
 Fisk, James ("Big Jim") (1834–1872), Erie
 Fitzgerald, J. M. (b. 1877), WM 1913–1914
 Flagler, Henry Morrison (1830–1913), FEC 1885–1913
 Fleming, Joseph B., RI 1933–1947
 Flynn, William J., Amtrak 2020- 
 Forbes, John Murray (1813–1898), MC 1846–1855, CB&Q
 Fordyce, Samuel W. (1840–1919), SLA&T 1886–1889, SSW 1890–1898, KCS 1900
 Franklin, Walter S., PRR 1948–1954, LIRR 1954–1955
 Fraser, Donald V., MKT 1945–1956
 Frederick, William A., CFNR 1993–
 Furth, Alan, SP 1979–1982

G 

 Gabreski, Francis S. (1919–2002), LIRR 1978–1981
 Gadsden, James (1788–1858), South Carolina Rail Road 1840–1850
 Gallois, Louis (b. 1944), SNCF 1996–2006
 Gamble, Patrick K. (b. 1945), ARR 2001–present
 Gardner, William A., CNW 1910–1916 
 Gardner, William E., WSOR 1988–present
 McClellan George B. (1826-1885), P 1857-1859
 Garneau, Cynthia, VIA 2019–present
 Garrett, John W. (1820–1884), B&O 1858–1884
 Garrett, Robert, II (1847–1896), B&O 1884–1887
 Gastler, Harold L., MKT 1975–1988
 George, W. H. Krome (1918–2004), NS 1979–1990
 Gibbons, William M. (1919–1990), RI 1975–1984
 Gibson, Gary, IHB -present
 Giles, John, RailAmerica, FEC 2008–present
 Gilliland, Jack E., AT&N, SLSF 1965–.
 Gilmore, Robert C., SOO 1986–1987
 Gillouard, Catherine, RATP 2017–present
 Gohlke, Reiner, DB 1982–1990
 Goode, David R. (b. 1941), NS 1991–2005
 Goodenow, William, MEC 1862–1863
 Goodfellow, Thomas M., LIRR 1955–1967
 Gordon, Donald (1901–1969), CN 1950–1966
 Gorman, James E. (died 1942), RI 1917–1942
 Gorman, Paul, PC
 Goto, Shinpei (1857–1929), South Manchuria Railway 1906–1908
 Gould, George Jay, I (1864–1923), DRGW, WP, MP 1892–1915
 Gould, Jay (1836–1892), Erie 1868–1872, UP 1870s–1883, New York City elevated railroads 1881–1888, MP 1879–1892
 Gowen, Franklin B. (1836–1889), RDG 1866–1883
 Granet, Guy, Sir (1867–1943), Midland Railway (UK) 1906–1922, LMS 1923–1927
 Grant, James (1812–1891), RI 1851–1854
 Gray, Carl R. (1867–1939), GN 1912–1914, WM 1914–1919, UP 1920–1937
 Green, Chris, Virgin Rail Group 1999–2005, Network Rail 2005–2010
 Green, Fred J., CPR 2005–present
 Greenough, Allen J. (1905–1974), PRR 1960–1968
 Grinstein, Gerald (b. 1932), BN 1985–1995
 Grout, H. C., SOO 1944–1949
 Grube, Rüdiger (b. 1951), DB 2009-2017
 Gunn, David L. (b. 1937), SEPTA 1979–1984, New York City MTA 1984–1990, WMATA 1991–1994, TTC 1995–1999, Amtrak 2002–2005
 Gurley, Fred (1889–1976), ATSF 1944–1958

H 

 Hagerman, John J. (1838–1909), CM 1885–1890
 Hall, Harold H., SOU 1980–1982
 Hall, John Manning, NH 1899−1903
 Haile, Columbus, MKT 1927–1930
 Hanna, David Blyth (1858–1938), CNoR 1918–1919, CN 1919–1922
 Hannaford, Jule Murat (1850–1934), NP 1913–1920
 James Theodore Harahan, IC 1906–1911
 Harriman, E. H. (1848–1909), UP 1904–1909, SP 1901–1909
 Harris, Robert (1830–1894), CB&Q 1876–1878, NP 1884–1888
 Harrison, Fairfax, SOU 1913–1937
 Harrison, E. Hunter (1944–2017), IC 1993–1998, CN 2003–2009. CP 2012–2017, CSX 2017
 Harrold, Orville R. (1932–2005), PW 1980–2005
 Hartt, Jay Samuel (died 1962), CSS&SB 1938–1960

 Havemeyer, Henry, LIRR 1875–1876
 Haverty, Mike (b. 1944), ATSF 1989–1995, KCS 1995–2010
 Haviland, Isaac E., LIRR 1850–1851 and 1852–1853
 Hayakawa, Senkichi, South Manchuria Railway 1921–1922
 Hayashi, Hakutaro, South Manchuria Railway 1932–1935
 Hays, Charles Melville, SP 1900–1901
 Heineman, Benjamin W. (1914–2012), CNW 1956–1968
 Henrici, Jacob, P&LE 1881–1885
 Henry, Paula, UTAH 2008–present
 Hicks, Valentine, LIRR 1837–1838
 Hill, James J. (1838–1916), SP&P 1873–1879, GN 1879–1907, NP
 Hiltz, John P., Jr., D&H 1967
 Hines, Walker D. (1870–1934), ATSF 1916–17, USRA 1918–1919
 Holden, Hale, SP 1928–1939

 Holliday, Cyrus K. (1826–1900), ATSF 1860–1863
 Hone, Philip (1780–1851), D&H 1825–1826
 Hooper, James, Erie two months in 1845
 Hood, John Mifflin, WM 1874–1902
 Hopkins, Mark (1813–1878), CP 1861–
 Hoppe, Charles W., LIRR 1990–1994
 Howard, Nathaniel Lamson (1884–1949), CGW 1925–1929
 Huges, Timo (b. 1965), NS (Dutch Railways) 2013–present
 Hughes, David, Amtrak 2005–2006
 Hughitt, Marvin, CNW 1887–1910
 Hungerford, Samuel J., CN 1932–1941
 Hunnewell, H. H. (1810–1902), KCFS&G, KCL&S
 Huntingdon, G. R., SOO 1922–1923
 Huntington, Collis P. (1821–1900), CP 1862–, C&O 1871–1888
 Huntington, Henry E. (1850–1927), PE
 Hurlbut, Hinman (1819–1884), CCCI
 Hustis, James H. (1864–1942), NH 1913–1914, B&M 1914–1926

I 
 Idrac, Anne-Marie (b. 1951), RATP 2002–2006, SNCF 2006–2008
 Ingalls, Melville E. (1842–1914), CCC&StL 1889–1905
 Ingram, John W., RI 1974–1975
 Insull, Samuel (1859–1938), CNS&M, CA&E, CSS&SB 1925–1933
 Ives, Brayton (1840–1914), NP 1893–1896

J 
 Jacobson, L. S. "Jake", CBRY -present
 Jaffray, C. T., SOO 1924–1937
 Jeffers, William, UP 1937–
 Jenks, Downing B., RI 1956–1961, MP
 Jervis, John B. (1795–1885), RI 1851–1854
  Jewett, Hugh J. (1817–1898), Erie 1874–1884
 Johnson, Lucius E. (1846–1921), N&W 1904–1921
 Johnson, R. Ellis, RI 1961–1964
 Johnson, William B., IC 1967–1969
 Johnston, Charles E. (1881–1951), KCS 1928–1938
 Johnston, Paul W., Erie 1949–1956
 Johnston, Wayne A. (1897–1967), IC 1945–1966
 Joy, James F. (1810–1896), MC
 Joyce, Patrick H. (1879–1946), CGW 1931–1946

K 
 Kakiuchi, Takeshi, JR West −2005
 Kalikow, Peter S. (b. 1943), NYMTA 2001–2007
 Kamarás, Miklós, MÁV −2008
 Kasyanov, Alexander, East Siberian Railway −2004
 Kawamura, Takeji, South Manchuria Railway 1922–1924
 Keddi, Herbert, DR 1989–1990
 Keep, Albert (1826–1907), CNW, LSMS
 Kenefick, John, UP 1971–1986
 Kenny, Raymond P., LIRR 2006–2007
 Keyes, Henry (1810–1870), ATSF 1869–1870
 Kidde, Walter (1877–1943), NYSW 1937–1943
 Kidder, John Flint (died 1901), NCNG −1901
 Kidder, Sarah, NCNG 1901–1913
 Kilbourn, Byron (1801–1870), Milwaukee and Mississippi Railroad 1849–1852
 Kiley, John P., MILW −1957
 Kimball, Benjamin, CS 1880
  Kimball, Frederick J. (1844–1903), N&W 1881–1903
 Kimmel, William (1812–1886), B&O
 King, James Gore (1791–1853), Erie 1835–1839
 King, John, Erie 1884–1894
 Kittson, Norman (1814–1888), SPM&M 1879–
 Klemm, Hans, DR 1990–1991
 Knott, Stuart R. (1859–1943), KCS 1900–1905
 Kohiyama, Naoto, South Manchuria Railway 1943–1945
 Kramer, Erwin, DR 1950–1970
 Krebs, Robert, SP 1982–1984, BNSF
 Kreikemeyer, Willi, DR 1949–1950
 Kruttschnitt, Julius, SP 1913–1925
 Kummant, Alexander (b. 1942), Amtrak 2006–2008
 Kunisawa, Simbei, South Manchuria Railway 1917–1919

L 
 Lafevers, Brad, GMA 2004–present
 Langdon, Jervis, Jr., RI 1965–1970
 Lawless, Ronald E., CN 1987–1992
 LeClair, Maurice (1927–2020), CN 1982–1986
 Leeds, William Bateman, RI 1901–1904
 LeFrançois, Marc (b. 1939), Via 2000−2004
 Levine, John P., Pinsly -present
 Lewis, Drew (1931–2016), UP 1986–1997
 Lewis, Roger (1912–1987), Amtrak 1971–1974
 Linchevski, Ofer, Israel Railways 2005–present
 Loder, Benjamin (1801–1876), Erie 1845–1853
 Logan, William A., NYSW 1968–
 Lok, Jesper, DSB 2011–present
 Lord, Eleazer (1788–1871), Erie 1833–1835, 1839–1841 and 1844–1845
 Lord, Henry C. (1824–1884), ATSF 1868–1869

 Loree, Leonor F. (1858–1940), B&O 1901–1903, D&H 1907–1938, KCS 1918–1920
 Lovett, Robert S. (1860–1932), SP 1909–1913, UP 1910–1911
 Lowden, Frank Orren (1861–1943), RI 1933–1943
 Lowry, Thomas (1843–1909), SOO 1889–1890, 1892–1909
 Ludewig, Johannes (b. 1945), DB 1997–1999

M 
 Macfarlane, Robert Stetson (1899–1982), NP 1951–1966
  Mackenzie, William (1849–1923), TSR 1891–, CNoR 1895–, Brascan 1899–
 MacMillan, Norman J. (1909–1978), CN 1967–1974
 MacNamara, G. Allen, SOO 1950–1960
 Magdei, Vasilie V. (d. 2006), Ulaanbaatar Railway 2004–2006
 Mahone, William (1826–1895), N&P 1853-1858
 Maidmen, Irving, NYSW
 Mallory, Francis (1807–1860), N&P
 Mann, Donald (1853–1934), CNoR
 Manvel, Allen (1837–1893), ATSF 1889–1893
 Markham, Charles H., IC 1911–1918
 Marsh, Ernest S., ATSF 1958–1967
 Marsh, Nathaniel, Erie 1861–1864
 Marsh, Samuel, Erie 1859–1861 and four months in 1864
  Martin, Edward L. (1837–1897), KCP&G 1889–1897
 Matsuoka, Yōsuke (1880–1946), South Manchuria Railway 1935–1939
 Maxwell, Gregory W., D&H 1970–1972
 Maxwell, William, Erie 1842–1843
 Mayer, Charles F. (1832–1904), B&O 1888–1896
 Maynard, Moses, Jr., LIRR 1851–1852
 McAdoo, William G. (1863–1941), H&M 1902–1913; USRA 1917–18
 McCabe, Frank Wells, D&H 1968
 McCahey, James B., Jr. (1920–1998), CSS&SB
 McCrea, James, PRR 1907–1912
 McCreey, William, P&LE 1875–1877
 McDonald, Angus Daniel (1878–1941), SP 1932–1941
 McDonald, Morris (1865–1938), B&M 1913–1914, MEC 1914–1932
 McGinnis, Patrick, B&M 1950–1960, NH 1954–
 McGonagle, William Albert “Al” (1861-1930), DM&IR (president) 1902-1930
 McIver, Bruce C., LIRR 1985–1989
 McKinnon, Arnold B., NS
 McLean, David G. A., CN -present
 McLeod, Archibald A., RDG
 McNear, Denman, SP 1976–1979

 McPherson, John D., IC, FEC 1999–2008
 Meerstadt, Bert (b. 1961), NS (Dutch Railways) 2009–2013
 Mehdorn, Hartmut (b. 1942), DB 1999–2009
 Mellen, Charles Sanger (1852–1927), NP 1897–1903, NH 1903–, MEC 1910–1914
 Menk, Louis W., NP 1966–1970, BN
 Mercier, Armand, SP 1941–1951
 Merrick, Samuel V., PRR 1847–1849
Meyers, W. Heyward, PRR 1889-1915
 Mięclewski, Maciej, PKP −2004
 Miller, Dennis H., IAIS 2004–present
 Miller, E. Spencer (d. 2005), MEC 1952–1978
 Millholland, James A., GC&C
 Minot, Charles, Erie Railroad 1850-45 and 1859–1864
 Mitchell, Alexander (1817–1887), MILW 1864–1887
 Moffat, David (1839–1911), DRGW 1887–1891, DNW&P 1902-1911
 Mohan, D.M. "Mike", SP 1984–1996
 Mohar, Mario, TFM −2005
 Mohler, A.L., UP 1911–1916

 Molson, John (1763–1836), C&StL
 Moore, W. Gifford, L&HR 1968–
 Moorman, Charles W. (b. 1953), NS 2004–2015, Amtrak 2016–2017
 Moran, Charles, Erie 1857–1859
 Moretti, Mauro (b. 1953), FS 2006–present
 Morrill, Anson P., MEC 1864–1866 and 1873–1875
 Morris, William E., LIRR 1853–1862
 Moyes, Chris (1949–2006), Go-Ahead Group 2005–2006
 Moyers, Edward, SP −1995
 Mudge, Henry U., RI 1909–1915
 Murray, Leonard, SOO 1961–1978

N 
 Nakamura, Korekimi, South Manchuria Railway 1908–1913
 Nakamura, Yujiro, South Manchuria Railway 1914–1917
 Nash, John Francis (1908–2004), P&LE 1953–1956, LV
 Nast, William F. (1840–1893), ATSF 1868
 William Neal, CPR 1947–1948
 Newall, James E., CPR
 Newell, John, P&LE 1887–1896
 Newton, Daniel Howe (1827–1911), HT&W 1887–1905
 Nickerson, Thomas (1810–1892), ATSF 1874–1880, CS 1880–1885
 Nomura, Ryutaro, South Manchuria Railway 1913–1914 and 1919–1921
 Norris, Ernest E., SOU 1937–1951
 Norton, Henry K., NYSW 1943–1955
 Nuelle, Joseph H., D&H 1938–1954

O 

 Oakes, Thomas Fletcher (1843–1919), NP 1888–1893
 Oeftering, Heinz Maria, DB 1957–1972
 Ogden, William Butler (1805–1877), G&CU 1848–1862, UP 1862–1863
 Ohmura, Takuichi, South Manchuria Railway 1939–1943
 Olyphant, George Talbot, D&H 1858–1869
 Olyphant, Robert M., D&H 1884–1903
 Osborn, Prime F., III, SCL, CSX
 Osipów, Andrzej (b. 1953), SKM 2006–2009
 Otsuka, Mutsutake (b. 1932), JR East 2000–present
  Ottensmeyer, Patrick J. (b. 1957),  KCS 2015–present

P 

 Packer, Asa (1805–1879), LV
 Page, William N. (1854–1932), VGN
 Palmer, William Jackson (1836–1909), KP, D&RG 1870–1901
 Parkinson, David L., CFNR 1993–
 Patterson, William C., PRR 1849–1852
 Pattison, Robert K., LIRR 1976–1978
 Payne, Henry Clay (1843–1904), TMER&L, NP
 Peabody, Charles A., IC 1918–1919
 Pease, Edward (1767–1858), S&D 1825–1829
 Pelletier, Jean (1935–2009), Via 2001–2004
 Pennington, Edmund, SOO 1909–1922
 Pepy, Guillaume (b. 1958), SNCF 2008–present 
 Perham, Josiah, NP 1864–1866
 Perlman, Alfred E. (1902–1983), NYC 1954–1968, PC 1968–1970, WP 1970–1973
 Peters, Ralph (1853–1923), LIRR 1905–1923
 Phelps, John Jay (1810–1869), DLW −1853
 Phelps, Timothy Guy (1824–1899), SP 1865–1868
 Pick, Frank (1878–1941), LPTB 1933–1940
 Pitcairn, Robert (1836–1909), PRR Pittsburgh Division
 Plant, Henry B. (1819–1899), Plant System
 Pomeroy, Samuel C. (1816–1891), ATSF 1863–1868
 Poppenhusen, Adolph, LIRR 1877
 Poppenhusen, Conrad, LIRR 1876
 Post, Waldron B., LIRR 1838–1839
 Potter, William F., LIRR 1905
 Pound, Thaddeus C. (1833–1914), CF&W, StPEGT
 Power, Thomas F., Jr., WC −2001
 Prendergast, Thomas F., LIRR 1994–2000, NYMTA 2013–present
 Provo, Larry S., CNW 1968–1976
 Purdy, Warren G., RI 1898–1901

Q 
 Qawi, Hanafi Abdel, Egyptian Railways −2006
 Quinlan, H.W., L&HR 1960–1968
 Quinn, William John, MILW 1957–1966 CB&Q 1966–1970

R 

 Ramsdell, Homer, Erie 1853–1857
 Ramsey, Joseph, Jr., WAB 1901–1905, WM 1903–1908
 Rea, Samuel, PRR 1913–1925, LIRR 1923–1928
 Redfearn, Donald D. (b. 1953), RailAmerica
 Reed, James H., P&LE 1892–1896
 Reed, John Shedd (1917–2008), ATSF 1967–1986
 Reid, Robert Gillespie (1842–1908), NFRy 1889–1908
 Reidy, Edward T. (1903–1975), CGW 1957–1968
 Reinhart, Joseph, ATSF 1893–1894
 Reistrup, Paul, Amtrak 1974–1978
 Rice, Richard D., MEC 1870–1873
 Rice, W. Thomas (1913–2006), RFP 1955–1957, ACL 1957–1967, SCL 1967–, CSX
 Rich, Walter (1946–2007), NYSW 1980–
 Riddle, Hugh (1822–1892), RI 1877–1883
 Rión, Francisco Javier, TFM 2005–present
 Ripley, Edward Payson, ATSF 1896–1920
 Ritchie, Robert J., CPR 1990–2005
 Roberson, Bob, FWWR
 Roberts, George B., PRR 1880–1896
 Robinson, William Jr., O&P 1848–
Rogers, Henry H. (1840–1909), VGN
 Ronan, William J. (1912–2014), NYMTA 1965–1974
 Ropes, David N., LIRR 1876–1877
 Rose, Matthew K. (b. 1960), BNSF 1999–present
 Ross, Walter L. (b. 1852), NKP 1929–
 Rouvillois, Philippe, SNCF −1986
 Rowland, Landon H., KCS 1990–1991
 Rowland, Ross, Pacific Wilderness Railway 2000–2001
 Roy, Jon R., IAIS −2002
 Russell, Donald (1900–1985), SP 1952–1972
 Rutter, James H., NYC 1883–1885

S 
 Sage, Russell (1816–1906), CM&StP
 St. Clair-Abrams, Alexander (1845–1931), TO&A
 Saunders, Stuart T. (1909–1987), N&W 1958–1963, PRR 1963–1968, PC 1968–1970
 Scannell, Daniel T., LIRR 1981
 Schaff, Charles E., MKT 1923–1926
 Schieffer, Kevin V., DME 1996–2008
 Schlager, Walter L., Jr., LIRR 1969–1976
 Schmiege, Robert, CNW

 Schoonmaker, James M., P&LE
 Scott, I. Barry, CPR −1995
 Scott, Thomas A. (1823–1881), UP 1871–1874, PRR 1874–1880
 Scranton, George W. (1811–1861)
 Sease, Ralph E., NYSW 1955–1963
 Seger, C.B., UP 1918–1919
 Segień, Mikołaj, SKM -present
 Sengeløv, Keld (d. 2006), DSB −2006
 Sengoku, Mitsugu, South Manchuria Railway 1928–1931
 Sharp, Thomas R., LIRR 1877–1881
 Shaughnessy, Thomas George (1853–1923), CPR 1899–1918
 Sheffield, Bill (b. 1928), ARR 1997–2001
 Sheffield, Joseph Earl (1793–1882), Northampton Railroad
 Sherwood, Henry (1813–1896), W&L
 Shoemaker, Kent, D&H 1978–1982
 Shoener, Arthur, KCS 2005–2008 

 Shoup, Paul, SP 1929–1932
 Shumate, Stuart, RFP 1961–1981
 Simpson, Howard E. (1897–1985), B&O 1953–1961
 Sinclair, Ian David (1913–2006), CPR 1969–1981
 Sloan, Matthew S., MKT 1933–1945
 Sloan, Samuel (1817–1907), DLW 1867–1899
 Smith, Alfred H. (1863–1924), NYC 1914–1924
 Smith, Charles E. RDG −1866
 Smith, John Gregory (1818–1891), NP 1866–1872
 Smith, Marvin Louis Vice President Operations Texas Pacific – Missouri Pacific Railroad 1962–1968 
 Smith, Marvin Louis President St. Louis Terminal Railroad 1961–1962
 Smith, Richard Earl Trainmaster Texas-Pacific Missouri-Pacific Railroad 1961–1968 
 Smucker, David E., LIRR 1949–1950
 Snow, John W. (b. 1939), B&O 1985–1986, CSXT 1986–1988

 Spencer, Samuel (1847–1906), B&O 1887–1888, SOU 1894–1906
 Speyer, Edgar (1862–1932), UERL 1906–1915
 Squires, James, NS 1992–
 Sprague, Lucian (1882–1960), M&StL 1935–
 Sproule, William, SP 1911–1918 and 1920–1928
 Stamp, Josiah (1880–1941) LMS 1926–
 Stanley, Albert, Lord Ashfield (1874–1948), UERL 1920–1933, LPTB 1933–1947
 Stanford, Leland (1824–1893), CP 1861–1868, SP 1868–1893
 Starling, David (b. 1950), KCS 2008–2016 
 Stauffer, Grant (died 1949), CGW 1948–1949
 Stephen, George (1829–1921), CPR 1881–1888
 Sterzing, Carl B., D&H 1972–1977
 Stickney, Alpheus Beede (1840–1916), CGW 1883–1909
 Stilwell, Arthur Edward (1859–1928), KCP&G 1897–1900, KCM&O
 Stinson, William (b. 1935), CPR 1981–1990
 Stockdale, Fletcher (c. 1823–1890), Indianola Railroad
 Stoddard, A.E., UP 1949–1965
 Storey, William Benson (1857–1940), ATSF 1920–1933
 Strong, Henry, ATSF 1873–1874
 Strong, William Barstow (1837–1914), MC −1876, ATSF 1881–1889
 Swann, Thomas (1809–1883), B&O 1848–1853
 Swift, Charles M. (1854–1929), Meralco, Panay Railways, various Michigan companies
 Swinburn, Charles (b. 1942), RailAmerica
 Swartz, W. John, ATSF 1986–1989
 Symes, James H., PRR 1954–1963

T 
 Taylor, Hamish, Eurostar 1996–1999
 Taylor, Knowles, LIRR 1835–1837
  Taylor, Walter H. (1838–1916), N&W

 Tellier, Paul (b. 1939), CN 1992–2003
 Thayer, William F. (b. 1846), NNH
 Thomas, Eben B., Erie 1894–1901
 Thomas, Philip E. (1776–1861), B&O 1827–1836
 Thomson, Frank, PRR 1897–1899
 Thomson, John Edgar (1808–1874), PRR 1852–1874
 Thornton, Henry W. (1871–1933), CN 1922–1932
 Tishanin, Alexander, East Siberian Railway 2004–present
 Tobias, Steven C., AWW -present
 Towner, Terry, ABS -present
 Tracy, John F., RI 1866–1877
 Travis, Walter E., BAR
 Truesdale, William (1851–1935), MSTL 1887, DLW 1899–1925
 Tsutsumi, Yoshiaki (b. 1934), Seibu Railway −2004
 Turpin, Frank (1923–2005), ARR 1985–1993
 Tuttle, Lucius, B&M 1893–
 Twichell, Ginery (1811–1883), B&W 1857–, ATSF 1870–1873, BB&G, HT&W

U 
 Uchida, Yasuka, South Manchuria Railway 1931–1932
 Underwood, Frederick D., Erie 1901–1927

V 

 Vaerst, Wolfgang, DB 1972–1982
 Vanderbilt, Cornelius (1794–1877), NY&H 1862–, NYC 1867–
 Vanderbilt, Cornelius, II (1843–1899), NYC 1885–
 Vanderbilt, Frederick William (1856–1938), NYC
 Vanderbilt, Harold Stirling (1884–1970), NYC
 Vanderbilt, William Henry (1821–1885), NYC
 Vanderbilt, William Kissam (1849–1920), NYC
 Vanderbilt, William Kissam, II (1878–1944), NYC
 van Boxtel, Roger (b. 1954), NS 2015—
 van der Burch, John, SRY 2000–2008
  Van Horne, William Cornelius (1843–1915), CPR 1889–1899
 Van Sweringen, Mantis James (1881–1935), NKP, Erie, PM, HV, C&O
 Van Sweringen, Oris Paxton (1879–1936), NKP, Erie, PM, HV, C&O
 Vaughan, Robert Charles, CN 1941–1949
 Veenman, Aad, NS (Dutch Railways) 2002–2009
 Villard, Henry (1835–1900), NP 1881–1884
 Von Miller, Harry W., Erie 1956–1960, EL 1960–

W 
 Wach, Andrzej, PKP 2004–present
 Walker, Aldace F. (1842–1901), ATSF 1894–1895
 Walker, George, CPR 1948–1955
 Walsh, Mike, UP 1987–1991
 Walters, Henry (1848–1931), ACL
 Christopher O. Ward Executive Director of PANYNJ (2008-2011)
 Ward, Michael J., CSX 2003–2017
 Warrington, George (1952–2007), Amtrak 1998–2002
 Washburn, William D. (1831–1912), SOO 1883–1889
 Watkins, Hays T., Jr., Chessie System 1972–1986, CSX
 Watson, Peter H., Erie 1872–1874
 Webster, G. W., SOO 1937–1944
 Weeks, James H., LIRR 1847–1850
 Wegner, Mark J., TCW 2007–present
 West, Absolom M. (1818–1894), MSC 1864–
 White, William, D&H 1954–1967
 Whitehead, Charles N., MKT 1926
 Whitman, Reginald N., MKT 1970–1975

 Wilbur, George B., CS 1885–1887
 Wilcox, David, D&H 1903–1907
 Willard, Daniel (1861–1942), B&O 1910–1941
 Williams, Charles T., MKT 1961–1965
 Williams, Helena E., LIRR 2007–present
 Williams, John H., NWP 2006–present
 Wilson, Robin H.H., LIRR 1981–1985
 Winchell, Benjamin L., RI 1904–1909
 Winter, Edwin (1845–1930), NP 1896–1897, BRT 1902–
 Wolfe, James R. (1930–1988), Chicago and North Western
 Woodruff, Robert E. (1884–1957), Erie 1939–1949
 Wright, Charles Barstow, NP 1875–1879
 Wurtz, John, D&H 1831–1858
 Wyer, William, LIRR 1951–1954

Y 

 Yakunin, Vladimir (b. 1948), Russian Railways 2005–2015
 Yamamoto, Jyotaro, South Manchuria Railway 1927–1929
 Yamazaki, Masao, JR West 2005–present
 Yamazaki, Motoki, South Manchuria Railway 1945
 Yasuhiro, Banichiro, South Manchuria Railway 1924–1927
 Yerkes, Charles (1837–1905), UERL 1902–1905
 Yohe, Curtis M., P&LE 1929–1953
 Yohe, James B., P&LE
 Young, James R. (1952–2014), UP (president) 2004–2014 (CEO) 2006–2014
 Young, Robert R. (1897–1958), C&O 1942–, NYC 1954–1958
 Yulee, David Levy (1810–1886), Yulee Railroad

See also
List of people associated with rail transport

Footnotes

References 
 

Executives
Executives
Railroad